The Montreux Ladies Open is a tournament for professional female tennis players played on outdoor clay courts. The event is classified as a $60,000 ITF Women's Circuit tournament and has been held in Montreux, Switzerland, since 2017.

Past finals

Singles

Doubles

External links 
 
 ITF search

ITF Women's World Tennis Tour
Recurring sporting events established in 2017
Clay court tennis tournaments
Tennis tournaments in Switzerland 
Montreux Ladies Open
2017 establishments in Switzerland